Jintang may refer to the following locations in China:

Jintang County (金堂县), Chengdu, Sichuan
Jintang Island (金塘岛), in Zhoushan, Zhejiang
Jintang Township (金塘乡), Qiaojia County, Yunnan
Towns (金塘镇)
Jintang, Maoming, town in Maonan District, Maoming, Guangdong
Jintang, Chongyang County, town in Chongyang County, Hubei
Jintang, Zhoushan, town in Dinghai District, Zhoushan, Zhejiang